Sonia Bruno is a retired Spanish film actress.

Selected filmography
 Snakes and Ladders (1965)
 Mission to Caracas (1965)
 Would You Marry Me? (1967)
 The Sailor with Golden Fists (1968)
 Fruit of Temptation (1969)

References

Bibliography 
 Peter Cowie & Derek Elley. World Filmography: 1967. Fairleigh Dickinson University Press, 1977.

External links 
 

Living people
Spanish film actresses
Film actresses from Catalonia
People from Barcelona
Year of birth missing (living people)